PFP or PfP may stand for:

Government and politics
Partido Federal ng Pilipinas, a right-wing political party in the Philippines
People First Party (South Korea)
People First Party (Republic of China), a political party in the Republic of China (Taiwan)
Peace and Freedom Party (USA)
Progressive Federal Party (South Africa)
Popular Front Party (Ghana)
Federal Preventive Police (Mexico) (Policía Federal Preventiva)
Partnership for Peace, a NATO programme for Warsaw Pact countries post-dissolution of the Soviet empire

Science and technology
Diphosphate—fructose-6-phosphate 1-phosphotransferase enzyme
Passive fire protection
Pentafluorophenyl esters
Perfluoropentacene (organic semiconductor)
Perforin (formerly PFP gene)
Photoelectric flame photometer
Plutonium Finishing Plant, at Hanford Site nuclear research complex, Washington, USA
Pore-forming proteins

Sports
Pitchers' fielding practice (baseball)
Pauline Ferrand-Prévot (born 1992), French racing cyclist

Other

Profile picture
Pay for performance (healthcare)
Porno for Pyros
Places for People, the largest housing association in England
Personal Financial Planner
Prep for Prep